Screen theory is a Marxist–psychoanalytic film theory associated with the British journal Screen in the early 1970s. It considers filmic images as signifiers that do not only encode meanings but also mirrors in which viewers accede to subjectivity. The theory attempts to discover a way of theorizing a politics of freedom through cinema that focuses on diversity instead of unity. Here, the Marxist emphasis on universal consciousness as a basis for defining emancipation shifted to the articulation of diversities and multiplicities of individual and collective experience due to the psychoanalytic elaboration of the unconscious.

Overview
The theoreticians of the "Screen theory" approach—Colin MacCabe, Stephen Heath and Laura Mulvey—describe the "cinematic apparatus" as a version of Althusser's ideological state apparatus. According to Screen theory, it is the spectacle that creates the spectator and not the other way round. The fact that the subject is created and subjected at the same time by the narrative on screen is masked by the apparent realism of the communicated content. This is also explained by Screen's conceptualization of the post-structuralist theory, which regards a text as an act of intervention in the present so that the film is considered a work of production of meanings rather than reflection. Instead of taking representation as a means of reproducing what is real, representation serves as a point of departure. 

Screen theory's origins can be traced to the essays "Mirror Stage" by Jacques Lacan and Jacques-Alain Miller's Suture: Elements of the Logic of the Signifier. This theory describes an infant who has a fragmented experience of its body but once he looks in a mirror, he sees a whole being instead of fragmentary one. Lacan called this a deception, one that is essential to the function of imaginary order that creates illusory wholeness.

See also
Gaze
Elizabeth Cowie

References

Further reading
 Heath, Stephen (1981): Questions of Cinema. Bloomington: Indiana University Press.
 MacCabe, Colin (1985): Theoretical Essays: Film, Linguistics, Literature. Manchester: Manchester University Press.

Marxism